The Joe Moore Award is awarded annually to the best college football offensive line unit. The award is presented by the Joe Moore Foundation for Teamwork and they state that "The Joe Moore Award for the Most Outstanding Offensive Line Unit will annually recognize the toughest, most physical offensive line in the country, making it the only major college football award to honor a unit or group.

The award's namesake, Joe Moore, was a long-time offensive line coach at Notre Dame and Pittsburgh. The award was created with the help of former Notre Dame All-American offensive guard Aaron Taylor, who played for Moore.

The award was first given after the 2015 college football season. A committee of voters are made up of all 128 FBS offensive line coaches, media members who played offensive line and a “legacy committee,” including colleagues of Moore and players who were coached by him.

Winners

See also 
 Jim Parker Trophy

References

External links
 

College football national player awards
Awards established in 2015